The Ministry for Gozo is the ministry of the Government of Malta with responsibility for the island of Gozo. It was established in 1987.

Ministers have been:
 Anton Tabone, 1987–1996
 Anton Refalo, 1996–1998, as Parliamentary Secretary for Gozo
 Giovanna Debono, 1998–2013
 Anton Refalo, 2013–2017
 Justyne Caruana, 2017–2020.
 Clint Camilleri, 2020-present

References 

Gozo
Lists of government ministers of Malta
Government of Malta